As Seen on the Internet is the fifth studio album by American rapper Futuristic. It was released on August 26, 2016 through We're The Future Records. The album features guest appearances from Hopsin, Devvon Terrell, Karmin and Goody Grace.

Background and promotion
In an interview with Sway Calloway, about the album, Futuristic said that:

"As Seen on the Internet" is a project that I been wanting to do forever and it's basically it came from like, I popped off from doing that nerd rap and what I did was I collab with a big YouTuber and I dropped my video on the same day and we cross promoted them. So we did that and I just got hella fans from it so I was like "If I could do that one time, what would happen if I did a whole album and every song was like that where I grabbed the biggest people from the internet that they're not even in music necessarily just big people from the internet and incorporated them into the album?".

After the release of the album, Futuristic released eleven music videos all directed by Jakob Owens to promote the album.

Commercial performance
The album debuted at number 116 on the Billboard 200 for the chart dated September 17, 2016. It also debuted on the Top R&B/Hip-Hop Albums and Rap Albums charts at number ten and eight respectively and debuted at number 200 in the Belgian Albums chart.

Track listing
Credits are adapted from the American Society of Composers, Authors and Publishers (ASCAP) and YouTube.

Notes
 "The Time Is Now"  features vocals by Shia LaBeouf.
 "Do It"  features vocals by Lexy Panterra
 "No Service" features vocals by Patrick Warburton, Seth MacFarlane, Jason Statham, Morgan Freeman and Peter Cullen.

Charts

References

External links

2016 albums
Futuristic (rapper) albums
Concept albums